Aaron Walker may refer to:

 T-Bone Walker (1910–1975), American musician
 Aaron Walker (American football) (born 1980), former American football player
 Aaron Walker (motorcycle racer) in 2011 British Supersport Championship season
 Aaron Walker (soccer) (born 1990), American soccer player